11 Honoré is a Los Angeles-based luxury plus-sized contemporary fashion e-retailer that works directly with high-end designers and brands, including Zac Posen, Prabal Gurung, Jason Wu, Christian Siriano and more. Founded in 2017 by Patrick Herning, the company began with investments from Forerunner, Nordstrom, Upfront, Greycroft and Canvas. Over time, the company would expand from its initial 15 brands at launch to almost 90 within two years of its launch.

In 2019, 11 Honoré received significant press coverage for its event at New York Fashion Week featuring a size-inclusive runway featuring multiple designers, headlined by actress Laverne Cox and plus-sized models including Candice Huffine, Marquita Pring, Precious Lee, Stella Duval and Tara Lynn.

In 2020 the company launched its own private label, initially featuring 24 pieces.

In October 2021, 11 Honoré announced a partnership with Nordstrom where the company's clothing will be accessible in Nordstrom stores as well as on the retailer's website.

References

Plus-size models
Clothing companies established in 2017
Online clothing retailers of the United States